The 1988 Cork Senior Hurling Championship was the 100th staging of the Cork Senior Hurling Championship since its establishment by the Cork County Board in 1887. The championship began on 1 May 1988 and ended on 16 October 1988.

Midleton entered the championship as the defending champions, however, they were defeated by Blackrock in the second round.

The final was played on 16 October 1988 at Páirc Uí Chaoimh in Cork, between St. Finbarr's and Glen Rovers, in what was their first meeting in the final in seven years. St. Finbarr's won the match by 3-18 to 2-14 to claim their 24th championship title overall and a first title in four years.

Brian Cunningham was the championship's top scorer with 2-29.

Team changes

To Championship

Promoted from the Cork Intermediate Hurling Championship
 Erin's Own

Results

First round

Second round

Quarter-finals

Semi-finals

Final

Championship statistics

Top scorers

Overall

In a single game

References

Cork Senior Hurling Championship
Cork Senior Hurling Championship